Narendra Singh is an Indian politician and a member of the 17th Lok Sabha.

Narendra Singh may also refer to:

Narendra Singh Negi
Narendra Singh (politician)